Kangema Constituency is an electoral constituency in Muranga County, Kenya.

It encompasses Kangema township which is the headquarters of the newly created Murang'a North District.  Murang'a North is a heavily populated district of the Central Province and  it covers a vast portion of the Aberdare Ranges. The economic mainstay for Kangema is agriculture, most of the land being under Tea, Coffee, wattle and subsistence food crops. There is vibrant trade of consumer goods in the township and the adjacent towns of Gakira, Gitugu, Kiairathe Kanyenya-ini and Rwathia.

Nascent industry includes milk, tea and coffee processing factories. The area is well served by transport and communication infrastructure.

Members of Parliament

Locations and wards

Locations

Wards

References

External links 
 Kangema Constituency Development Fund website
Map of the constituency

Constituencies in Central Province (Kenya)
Constituencies in Murang'a County